Zulfiya Ibragimovna Umidova (1897-1980), was a Uzbekistani physician.

She became the first female physician in Uzbekistan in 1922.

She was born in Tashkent. She studied at a girls' school in Tashkent and then at the Women's Medical Institute in Petrograd. In 1920-1922 she was instructor at the people's commissar office of health. In 1922 she graduated from the Central Asian State University. She was active at the Tashkent Medical Institute  in 1930–1944. She became a doctor of medicine in 1946. She became a member of the Academy of Medicine Science in 1948.

She was also a politician. She elected to the municipal council of Tashkent (1961, 1965, 1967).

References

1897 births
Uzbekistani physicians
20th-century Uzbekistani women politicians
20th-century Uzbekistani politicians
Soviet women physicians
Physicians from Tashkent
1980 deaths